Unish-Kuri is one of the youngest fortnightly magazines published from ABP Ltd, publishers of Anandabazar Patrika and The Telegraph, of Kolkata, India. It took off as a new division or wing of Anandamela, the 33-year-old children's magazine published in Bengali. It is published in Kolkata. Its name literally means "nineteen twenty", and it is targeted at teens and young adults.

History and growth of the magazine 
First published on 19 June 2004, the magazine was primarily focused on teenagers and young adults. Unish-Kuri also has a subsidiary called Unish-Kuri Career that deals exclusively with careers.

Content 
Unish-Kuri maintains a colorful outlook. While many magazines  are doing away with fiction, Unish Kuri has established its romantic fiction section strongly among its readers. Also popular among its readers is fiction falling under thriller genre. Unish Kuri also publishes serial novels. The regular sections are:

Cover story
Mail e-mail (readers' mails)
Teen fashion
Beauty tips
Solution to personal problems
Career-related tips
Laughter/humour
Messageboard
Sharing of readers' personal experiences
Short story
Serial novel
Celebrity interviews
Latest from the world of science and IT
Astrological predictions
Campus news
Debate
Calendar (events of the fortnight)

The latest in content of Unish-Kuri is a special column by Rupam Islam, the popular youth icon from Kolkata, in which Rupam gives advice and solution to the youth.

The magazine encourages article and fiction-contribution of readers.

Activities 
Unish Kuri has started activities like a Unish-Kuri model hunt, and a melodious voice hunt from 2005. These talent hunts have been popular.

Key writers
Binayak Bandopadhyay
Caesar Bagchi
Sangita Bandopadhyay
Rajesh Basu
Suchitra Bhattacharya
Smaranjit Chakraborty
Sukanto Gangopadhyay
Sunil Gangopadhyay
Pinaki Ghosh
Rajat Ghosh
Prachet Gupta
Samaresh Majumder
Krishnendu Mukhopadhyay
Indranil Sanyal
Paulami Sengupta

See also
Anandamela
Anandabazar Patrika
Ananda Publishers
List of teen magazines

External links
Official website

2004 establishments in West Bengal
ABP Group
Bengali-language magazines
Biweekly magazines published in India
Magazines published in India
Magazines established in 2004
Mass media in Kolkata
Teen magazines